Philip Klein may refer to:
 Philip Klein (composer), American film and television composer
 Philip Klein (editor), American journalist and editor
 Philip Klein (rabbi) (1849–1926), Hungarian-American rabbi
 Philip Klein (screenwriter) (1889–1935), American screenwriter
 Philip N. Klein, American computer scientist